Filothei is a green, affluent northeastern suburb of Athens, Greece, consisting mainly of hillside villas, relatively close to the Olympic Stadium. Since the 2011 local government reform it is part of the municipality Filothei-Psychiko, of which it is a municipal unit. The municipal unit has an area of 2.301 km2.

Overview
One of the traditionally rich northern suburbs of Athens, Filothei has been historically home to important people such as politicians and businessmen; it is also home to many of Athens' foreign residents, especially those employed in diplomatic capacities. Filothei is also home to numerous foreign embassies.

Historical population

References

External links
Official website  

Populated places in North Athens (regional unit)